Benvindo António dos Santos Moreno (born 10 November 1989) is a Bissau-Guinean football player.

Club career
He made his professional debut in the Segunda Liga for Boavista on 24 August 2008 in a game against Vizela.

References

1989 births
Sportspeople from Bissau
Living people
Bissau-Guinean footballers
Bissau-Guinean expatriate sportspeople in Portugal
Boavista F.C. players
Liga Portugal 2 players
C.D. Aves players
F.C. Tirsense players
G.D. Chaves players
Padroense F.C. players
Lusitânia F.C. players
C.D. Tondela players
AD Oliveirense players
Gondomar S.C. players
SC Mirandela players
Leça F.C. players
Association football midfielders